Harpalus mitridati is a species of ground beetle in the subfamily Harpalinae. It was described by Pliginskiy in 1915.

References

mitridati
Beetles described in 1915